is the terminal point of land at the west end of Atsumi Peninsula in southern Aichi Prefecture, Japan.  The cape forms one side of the entrances to Ise Bay and Mikawa Bay, which are divided by the Chita Peninsula.  Because it is a crucial landmark for ships  is located in the cape to help guide and warn passing ships.

References 

Irago
Landforms of Aichi Prefecture